Ralph Kelsey Foster (May 11, 1884 – February 2, 1956) was an American football player and coach. He was the second head football coach at The Citadel, serving for three seasons, from 1906 until 1908, and compiling a record of 8–6–2.

Foster died in 1956.

Head coaching record

References

External links
 

1884 births
1956 deaths
American football ends
The Citadel Bulldogs football coaches
South Carolina Gamecocks football players
People from Lancaster, South Carolina
Players of American football from South Carolina